Windswept Farm is a historic home located at Clinton in Dutchess County, New York.  The main block of the house was built about 1823 and is a Federal-style dwelling.  The main block is a 2-story, five-bay timber-frame house.  A -story gabled addition was completed about 1840. Also on the property are two barns and a cider mill.

It was added to the National Register of Historic Places in 1989.

References

Houses on the National Register of Historic Places in New York (state)
Houses completed in 1823
Houses in Dutchess County, New York
National Register of Historic Places in Dutchess County, New York
Farms on the National Register of Historic Places in New York (state)